Frank Sayles Bowen Jr. (March 4, 1905 – September 24, 1976) was a United States Army major general who served as commander of the 187th Airborne Infantry Regiment during the Korean War.

Early life and education
Bowen was born in Manila, Philippines, to Mildred A. Bowen and Frank S. Bowen.

Military career

Bowen attended the United States Military Academy at West Point, graduating in 1926. From mid-1939 to mid-1947, his career tracked that of his mentor Robert L. Eichelberger. He served under Eichelberger in the 30th Infantry Regiment and, in 1940, he served as aide-de‐camp to Eichelberger while the latter was superintendent of West Point. With the United States entry into World War II, Eichelberger took command of the 77th Infantry Division with Bowen as his Personnel Officer (G-1). Eichelberger soon took command of I Corps with Bowen serving as assistant Operation Officer and then Operations Officer (G-3).

Colonel Bowen would receive his first Distinguished Service Cross for his actions on 12 December 1942 during the Battle of Buna–Gona. In August 1944, Eichelberger was given command of the newly formed Eighth United States Army and Bowen joined him as G-3.

Bowen served as commander of the 187th Airborne Infantry Regiment and led the unit in the Battle of Yongju, Operation Tomahawk and Operation Courageous during the Korean War. He served as commander of the 101st Airborne Division in 1955 and, that August, he became commander of Fort Jackson and remained in command of the base until August 1956. In September 1956 he became head of Military Assistance Advisory Group China in Taiwan and remained in that post until July 1958.

Bowen retired from the army in 1964. He died at Moncrief Army Hospital, Columbia, South Carolina on 24 September 1976.

References

External links
Generals of World War II

1905 births
1976 deaths
United States Army personnel of the Korean War
United States Army generals
Recipients of the Distinguished Service Cross (United States)
Recipients of the Silver Star
Recipients of the Legion of Merit
United States Military Academy alumni
United States Army generals of World War II
American people in the American Philippines